This is a list of current members of the Senate of Canada, the upper house of the Parliament of Canada. Unlike the members of Parliament in the House of Commons, the 105 senators are appointed by the governor general on the advice of the prime minister. Senators originally held their seats for life; however, under the British North America Act, 1965, members may not sit in the Senate after reaching the age of 75. From 1867 to 2015, prime ministers normally chose members of their own parties to be senators, though they sometimes nominated non-affiliated senators or members of opposing parties. The pattern of political affiliation in the Senate in the most recent era is distinct in several key respects from what has been the case historically. Since November 4, 2015, there has been no government caucus in the Senate because the Senate Liberal Caucus, which existed from 2014 until 2019, was not affiliated with the governing Liberal Party of Canada. On December 6, 2016, for the first time in Canadian history the number of senators without a partisan affiliation exceeded that of the largest caucus of senators with a partisan affiliation.

Seats are allocated on a regional basis, each of the four major regions receives 24 seats, and the remainder of the available seats being assigned to smaller regions. The four major regions are Ontario, Quebec, the Maritime provinces (New Brunswick, Nova Scotia and Prince Edward Island), and the Western provinces (Alberta, British Columbia, Manitoba and Saskatchewan). The seats for Newfoundland and Labrador, the Northwest Territories, Yukon, and Nunavut are assigned apart from these regional divisions. The province of Quebec has 24 Senate divisions that are constitutionally mandated. In all other provinces, a Senate division is strictly an optional designation of the senator's own choosing, and has no real constitutional or legal standing. A senator who does not choose a special senate division is considered a senator for the province at large. The distribution of seats has been criticized for not being proportional per region. For example, Ontario has 40 percent of Canada's population but only 24 seats, while the smaller Atlantic provinces have a combined 30, and British Columbia, the third most populous province, only has six seats.

, there are 89 sitting senators. Of the sitting senators: 39 are members of the Independent Senators Group, 15 are members of the senate caucus of the Conservative Party of Canada, 13 are members of the Progressive Senate Group, 14 are members of the Canadian Senators Group, and 8 are non-affiliated. 16 seats are currently vacant.

Active senators have been appointed on the advice of three different prime ministers: Justin Trudeau, Stephen Harper, and Jean Chrétien. George Furey is the longest-serving current senator; he was appointed on the advice of Jean Chretien in 1999. , there are 47 women in the Senate.

Current senators

Vacancies

Standings

Members of the Senate of Canada may sit as representatives of a political party if agreed by themselves and their party.
The current party standings in the Senate of Canada are as follows:

Membership changes since the last election

Standings changes since the last election

Appointment breakdown

Upcoming retirements
Twenty current senators are scheduled to retire before the end of 2025:		
George Furey, May 12, 2023, Non-affiliated (Chrétien) - Newfoundland and Labrador
Patricia Bovey, May 15, 2023, Progressive Senate Group (J. Trudeau) - Manitoba
Dennis Patterson, December 30, 2023, Canadian Senators Group (Harper) - Nunavut
Renée Dupuis, January 17, 2024, Independent Senators Group (J. Trudeau) - Quebec (The Laurentides)
Pierre-Hugues Boisvenu, February 12, 2024, Conservative (Harper) - Quebec (La Salle)
Percy Mockler, April 14, 2024, Conservative (Harper) - New Brunswick (St. Leonard)
Victor Oh, June 10, 2024, Conservative (Harper) - Ontario
Mobina Jaffer, August 20, 2024, Independent Senators Group (Chrétien) - British Columbia
Diane Bellemare, October 13, 2024, Progressive Senators Group (Harper) - Quebec (Alma)
Ratna Omidvar, November 5, 2024, Independent Senators Group (J. Trudeau) - Ontario
Stephen Greene, December 8, 2024, Canadian Senators Group (Harper) - Nova Scotia (Halifax — The Citadel)
Brent Cotter, December 18, 2024,	Independent Senators Group (J. Trudeau) -	Saskatchewan
Nancy Hartling, February 1, 2025, Independent Senators Group (J. Trudeau) - New Brunswick	
Jean-Guy Dagenais,	February 2, 2025, Canadian Senators Group (Harper) - Quebec  	 	 		
Don Plett,	May 14, 2025, Conservative (Harper) - Manitoba (Landmark)	 
Marc Gold,	June 30, 2025, Independent Senators Group (J. Trudeau) - Quebec (Stadacona)
Jane Cordy, July 2, 2025, Progressive Senate Group (Chrétien) - Nova Scotia	  			
Judith Seidman, September 1, 2025, Conservative (Harper) - Québec (De la Durantaye)
Marie-Françoise Mégie, September 21, 2025, Independent Senators Group (J. Trudeau) -  Quebec (Rougemont)
David Adams Richards, October 17, 2025, Canadian Senators Group  (J. Trudeau) -  New Brunswick

Longevity
Furthest year of retirement of existing senators, by prime minister

Pierrette Ringuette, appointed by Jean Chrétien, is due to retire on December 31, 2030
Michèle Audette, appointed by Justin Trudeau, is due to retire on July 20, 2046
Patrick Brazeau, appointed by Stephen Harper, is due to retire on November 11, 2049

See also
List of Senate of Canada appointments by prime minister

Notes

References

Senators, Current
Current
Senate
 Current
Canada